Nuu-chah-nulth,  Nootka,  is a Wakashan language in the Pacific Northwest of North America on the west coast of Vancouver Island, from Barkley Sound to Quatsino Sound in British Columbia by the Nuu-chah-nulth peoples. Nuu-chah-nulth is a Southern Wakashan language related to Nitinaht and Makah.

It is the first language of the indigenous peoples of the Pacific Northwest Coast to have documentary written materials describing it. In the 1780s, Captains Vancouver, Quadra, and other European explorers and traders frequented Nootka Sound and the other Nuu-chah-nulth communities, making reports of their voyages. From 1803–1805 John R. Jewitt, an English blacksmith, was held captive by chief Maquinna at Nootka Sound. He made an effort to learn the language, and in 1815 published a memoir with a brief glossary of its terms.

Name
The provenance of the term "Nuu-chah-nulth", meaning "along the outside [of Vancouver Island]" dates from the 1970s, when the various groups of speakers of this language joined together, disliking the term "Nootka" (which means "go around" and was mistakenly understood to be the name of a place, which was actually called Yuquot).  The name given by earlier sources for this language is Tahkaht; that name was used also to refer to themselves (the root aht means "people").

Phonology

Consonants

The 35 consonants of Nuu-chah-nulth:

Vowels

Nuu-chah-nulth vowels are influenced by surrounding consonants with certain "back" consonants conditioning lower, more back vowel allophones.

The mid vowels  and  appear in vocative forms and in ceremonial expressions.  is a possible realization of  after a glottalized sonorant.

In the environment of glottalized resonants as well as ejective and pharyngeal consonants, vowels can be "laryngealized" which often means creaky voice.

In general, syllable weight determines stress placement; short vowels followed by non-glottalized consonants and long vowels are heavy. In sequences where there are no heavy syllables or only heavy syllables, the first syllable is stressed.

Nuu-chah-nulth has phonemic short and long vowels. Traditionally, a third class of vowels, known as "variable length" vowels, is recognized. These are vowels that are long when they are found within the first two syllables of a word, and short elsewhere.

Grammar
Nuu-chah nulth is a polysynthetic language with VSO word order.

A clause in Nuu-chah-nulth must consist of at least a predicate. Affixes can be appended to those clauses to signify numerous grammatical categories, such as mood, aspect or tense.

Aspect 
Aspects in Nuu-chah-nulth help specify an action's extension over time and its relation to other events. Up to 7 aspects can be distinguished:

Where each "–" signifies the root.

Tense 
Tense can be marked using affixes (marked with a dash) and clitics (marked with an equal sign).

Nuu-chah-nulth distinguishes near future and general future:

The first two markings refer to a general event that will take place in the future (similar to how the word will behaves in English) and the two other suffixes denote that something is expected to happen (compare to the English going to).

Past tense can be marked with the =mit clitic that can itself take different forms depending on the environment and speaker's dialect:

Mood 
Grammatical mood in Nuu-chah-nulth lets the speaker express the attitude towards what they're saying and how did they get presented information. Nuu-chah-nulth's moods are:

Not counting the articles, all moods take person endings that indicate the subject of the clause.

Vocabulary
The Nuu-chah-nulth language contributed much of the vocabulary of the Chinook Jargon. It is thought that oceanic commerce and exchanges between the Nuu-chah-nulth and other Southern Wakashan speakers with the Chinookan-speaking peoples of the lower Columbia River led to the foundations of the trade jargon that became known as Chinook. Nootkan words in Chinook Jargon include hiyu ("many"), from Nuu-chah-nulth for "ten", siah ("far"), from the Nuu-chah-nulth for "sky".

A dictionary of the language, with some 7,500 entries, was created after 15 years of research. It is based on both work with current speakers and notes from linguist Edward Sapir, taken almost a century ago. The dictionary, however, is a subject of controversy, with a number of Nuu-chah-nulth elders questioning the author's right to disclose their language.

Dialects
Nuu-chah-nulth has 12 different dialects:

 Ahousaht  
 Ehattesaht ( Ehattisaht)  
 Hesquiat  
 Kyuquot  
 Mowachaht  
 Nuchatlaht  
 Ohiaht  ( Huu.ay.aht) 
 Clayoquot ( Tla.o.qui.aht)  
 Toquaht  
 Tseshaht ( Sheshaht)  
 Uchuklesaht ( Uchucklesaht)  
 Ucluelet  ( Yuułuʔiłʔatḥ)

Translations of the First Nation names

Nuu-Chah-Nulth - "all along the mountains and sea." Nuu-chah-nulth were formerly known as "Nootka" by colonial settlers (but they prefer not to be called that, rather Nuu-chah-nulth which better explains how each First Nation is connected to the land and the sea). Some of the names following (Ditidaht, Makah) are not part of the Nuu-chah-nulth political organization, however; all are atḥ (people). The term nuučaanułatḥ is also used, meaning "people all along the mountains and the sea."
Ahousaht - People of an open bay/People with their backs to the mountains and lands
Ucluelet - People with a safe landing place for canoes.
Ehattesaht - People of a tribe with many clans
Checkleset – People from the place where you gain strength
Hesquiaht - People who tear with their teeth
Kyuquot - Different people
Mowachaht - People of the deer
Muchalaht – People who live on the Muchalee river
Nuchatlaht - People of a sheltered bay
Huu-ay-aht - People who recovered
Tseshaht - People from an island that reeks of whale remains
Tla-o-qui-aht - People from a different place
Toquaht - People of a narrow passage
Uchucklesaht - People of the inside harbour
Ditidaht - People of the forest
Hupacasaht - People living above the water 
Quidiishdaht (Makah) - People living on the point
Makah - People generous with food

Translations of place names
Nuuchahnulth had a name for each place within their traditional territory. These are just a few still used to this day:

hisaawista (esowista) – Captured by clubbing the people who lived there to death, Esowista Peninsula and Esowista Indian Reserve No. 3.
Yuquot (Friendly Cove) – Where they get the north winds, Yuquot
nootk-sitl (Nootka) – Go around.
maaqtusiis – A place across the island, Marktosis
kakawis – Fronted by a rock that looks like a container.
kitsuksis – Log across mouth of creek
opitsaht – Island that the moon lands on, Opitsaht
pacheena – Foamy.
tsu-ma-uss (somass) – Washing, Somass River
tsahaheh – To go up.
hitac`u (itatsoo) – Ucluelet Reserve.
t’iipis – Polly’s Point.
Tsaxana – A place close to the river.
Cheewat – Pulling tide.

Resources
A Ehattesaht iPhone app was released in January 2012. An online dictionary, phrasebook, and language learning portal is available at the First Voices  	Ehattesaht Nuchatlaht Community Portal.

See also
Nuu-chah-nulth alphabet
Nuu-chah-nulth people
Nuu-chah-nulth Tribal Council
Nootka Jargon, a Nuu-chah-nulth-based predecessor of Chinook Jargon
Nitinaht language
Makah

Notes

References

 Kim, Eun-Sook. (2003). Theoretical issues in Nuu-chah-nulth phonology and morphology. (Doctoral dissertation, The University of British Columbia, Department of Linguistics).
 Nakayama, Toshihide (2001). Nuuchahnulth (Nootka) morphosyntax. Berkeley: University of California Press. 
 Sapir, Edward. (1938). Glottalized continuants in Navaho, Nootka, and Kwakiutl (with a note on Indo-European). Language, 14, 248–274.
 Sapir, Edward; & Swadesh, Morris. (1939). Nootka texts: Tales and ethnological narratives with grammatical notes and lexical materials. Philadelphia: Linguistic Society of America.
Adam Werle. (2015). Nuuchahnulth grammar reference for LC language notes. University of Victoria
 Sapir, Edward; & Swadesh, Morris. (1955). Native accounts of Nootka ethnography. Publication of the Indiana University Research Center in Anthropology, Folklore, and Linguistics (No. 1); International journal of American linguistics (Vol. 21, No. 4, Pt. 2). Bloomington: Indiana University, Research Center in Anthropology, Folklore, and Linguistics. (Reprinted 1978 in New York: AMS Press, ISBN).
 Shank, Scott; & Wilson, Ian. (2000). In S. Gessner & S. Oh (Eds.), Proceedings of the 35th International Conference on Salish and Neighboring Languages (pp. 185–197). UBC working papers is linguistics (Vol. 3).

External links
 An extract from the forthcoming Nuuchahnulth Dictionary
 Bibliography of Materials on the Nuuchanulth Language (YDLI)
 Nuuchahnulth (Nootka) (Chris Harvey’s Native Language, Font, & Keyboard)
 Nuuchahnulth Example Text
 The Wakashan Linguistics Page
 Grammatical Possession in Nuu-Chah-Nulth
 Deriving the definiteness effects in Nuu-chah-nulth locatives1
 Condition C in Nuu-chah-nulth*
 Nootka Language and the Nootka Indian Tribe at native-languages.org
 Nuu-chah-nulth (Intercontinental Dictionary Series)

+
Wakashan languages
Indigenous languages of the Pacific Northwest Coast
First Nations languages in Canada
Endangered Wakashan languages